Julian Byrn Goodman (May 1, 1922 – July 2, 2012) was an American broadcasting executive and journalist.

Personal
He was born in Glasgow, Kentucky and graduated from Glasgow High School. Goodman took a hard stance in support of the first amendment.

Career
Goodman was known for never asking for a raise or promotion. He started his career as a reporter working $3 a week for The Glasgow Daily Times. He attended Western Kentucky State Teachers College from 1939 to 1942 as an economics major. He left in 1943 to join the United States Army and served for a few months. After serving in the Army, he moved to Washington. He graduated from George Washington University in 1948. Here he met William McAndrew and was given a job for the night news desk. He served as president of NBC from 1966 to 1974. Goodman helped establish Chet Huntley and David Brinkley as a well-known news team and led the network from 1966 to 1974. While working for NBC, he negotiated a $1 million deal to retain Johnny Carson as host of The Tonight Show. He also spent some time attempting to put an end to the Fairness Doctrine.

Goodman was included on the master list of Nixon political opponents. He was also a member of the Peabody Awards Board of Jurors from 1986 to 1992.

Family
Goodman was married to his wife Betty Davis, who was also from Kentucky. Together they had four children, John, Jeffrey, Gregory, and Julie, along with six grandchildren.

Death
Goodman died on July 2, 2012, at his home in Juno Beach, Florida, at the age of 90. The cause of his death was from kidney failure.

Accolades
1973: Paul White Award, Radio Television Digital News Association

References

Sources
Staff report (June 28, 1973). Lists of White House 'Enemies' and Memorandums Relating to Those Named. The New York Times

1922 births
2012 deaths
American male journalists
George Washington University alumni
Peabody Award winners
People from Glasgow, Kentucky
Journalists from Kentucky
Western Kentucky University alumni
NBCUniversal people
NBC executives
Presidents of NBC
People from Juno Beach, Florida
Presidents of NBC Entertainment
Presidents of NBC News
20th-century American journalists
United States Army soldiers